King David is a musical, sometimes described as a modern oratorio, with a book and lyrics by Tim Rice and music by Alan Menken. The musical is based on Biblical tales from the Books of Samuel and 1 Chronicles, as well as text from David's Psalms.

Description and history
King David is mostly sung-through with little dialogue, and the music swings from pop to jazz to grand choral arrangements.  It uses a large orchestra and a large choir.

The work was conceived as an outdoor piece to commemorate the 3,000th anniversary of the city of Jerusalem.  However, according to Rice, "When it proved logistically and financially impossible to do it and Disney took an interest, we changed gears....  We felt we'd been commissioned to write it as an oratorio, and still hoped it would be performed as such in Israel.  ... we should have emphasized that more to avoid being judged primarily as a Broadway show."

Musical numbers 

Act I
Prologue – David, Bathsheba, Young Solomon, Joab and Chorus
Samuel 
Israel and Saul – Joab, Samuel, Saul and Chorus 
Samuel Confronts Saul – Saul, Samuel, Agag and Chorus 
Samuel Anoints David – Joab, Samuel, Jesse, David and Chorus
Saul 
The Enemy Within – Saul and Chorus 
There is a View... – Joab, Abner, Saul and Chorus 
Psalm 8 – David
Genius from Bethlehem – Saul, David, Abner, Joab, Jonathan and Michal
Goliath
The Valley of Elah – Goliath, Abner, Joab, David, Saul and Soldiers 
Goliath of Gath – Goliath, David, Joab, Soldiers and Chorus 
Sheer Perfection – Joab, Saul, David and Michal
Jonathan
Saul Has Slain His Thousands – Joab and Chorus 
You Have It All – Saul, Jonathan and David 
Psalm 23 – Saul and David 
You Have It All/Sheer Perfection (Reprises) – Jonathan, Joab, Michal and David
Exile
Hunted Partridge on the Hill – Joab, Saul, Michal, David and Men 
The Death of Saul – Saul, Jonathan, Ghost of Samuel and Chorus 
How Are The Mighty Fallen  

Act II
David the King
This New Jerusalem – David, Absalom, Voice of Jonathan, Joab and Chorus 
David and Michal – David, Joab and Michal 
The Ark Brought to Jerusalem – David and Chorus 
Never Again – Michal and David
Bathsheba
How Wonderful the Peace – Absalom, Joab, David and Chorus 
Off Limits – Bathsheba, David and Joab 
Warm Spring Night – David
When in Love – Bathsheba
Uriah's Fate Sealed – David, Joab, Bathsheba and Chorus 
Atonement – David, Ghosts of Saul & Samuel, Bathsheba and Chorus
Absalom 
The Caravan Moves On – Joab, Absalom, David, Ghosts of Saul & Samuel and Men 
Death of Absalom – Joab and Absalom 
Absalom My Absalom – David
David's Final Days
Solomon – Solomon, Joab, David and Bathsheba 
David's Final Hours – Michal, David, Joab, Bathsheba, Voices of Goliath, Saul, Jonathan & Samuel and Chorus 
The Long Long Day – David
This New Jerusalem (Reprise) – Solomon and Company

Productions
A concert version, produced by Disney Theatrical Productions and André Djaoui and directed by Mike Ockrent, was presented as the inaugural production at Disney's newly renovated New Amsterdam Theatre (the former home of the Ziegfeld Follies), playing for a nine-performance limited run in May 1997.  The cast included Roger Bart, Stephen Bogardus, Judy Kuhn, Alice Ripley, Martin Vidnovic, and Michael Goz, with Marcus Lovett in the title role. The piece ran two hours and 45 minutes and was only partially staged. 
  
On September 6, 1997, Patti LuPone, Davis Gaines, and Rebecca Luker gave a concert at the Hollywood Bowl that ended with three selections from King David.

There was a production in Irving, Texas in 2004.

Amateur and school productions include: Landmark Christian School Newnan, Georgia, near Atlanta in 2005. A concert performance was produced by NYU Steinhardt's Vocal Performance and the NYU Symphony Orchestra in conjunction with the authors on November 13 and 14, 2008.  In the summer of 2012, Neighborhood Church in Castro Valley, California, near Oakland, performed the musical as part of their yearly Summer Musical Series.

At present, there are no plans for a fully staged Broadway production.

Opening night cast 

Roger Bart – Jonathan    
Stephen Bogardus – Joab    
Anthony Galde – Absalom    
Judy Kuhn – Michal    
Marcus Lovett – David    
Alice Ripley – Bathsheba    
Peter Samuel – Samuel    
Martin Vidnovic – King Saul    

Bill Nolte – Goliath    
Timothy Shew – Abner    
Timothy Robert Blevins – Agag    
Peter C. Ermides – Uriah    
Michael Goz – Jesse    
Daniel James Hodd – Young Solomon    
Kimberly JaJuan – Abishag    
Dylan Lovett – Young Absalom

Critical response
The 1997 debut concert performance provoked a lukewarm review by The New York Times. Ben Brantley wrote: "...the show is sober, respectful, packed with enough information for a month of Bible-study classes and, on its own terms, most carefully thought out, with pop equivalents of operatic motifs and exotic folkloric touches a la Borodin. Yet while the well-sung cast, under Mike Ockrent's direction, and the orchestra (Michael Kosarin is the music director and Douglas Besterman the orchestrator) have been painstakingly polished, the show, at two hours and 45 minutes, just can't help being a Goliath of a yawn."

Variety called it "Unrelentingly serious-minded and devoid of the wit that Menken brought to previous projects".

The cast album, however, which cuts several musical numbers and reprises, has been praised.

References

External links 
Internet Broadway Database listing
Description of another production

1997 musicals
Broadway musicals
Musicals by Alan Menken
Musicals by Tim Rice
Musicals based on religious traditions
Musicals based on the Bible
Sung-through musicals
Cultural depictions of David
Disney Theatrical Productions musicals